Pwllyrhwyad, Llanarth, Monmouthshire is a cottage dating from the 16th century with some later additions. It is a Grade II* listed building.

History and description
Cadw date the original house to the 16th century, with additions in the following three centuries. Sir Cyril Fox and Lord Raglan, in their three-volume study Monmouthshire Houses, describe Pwllyrhwyad, which they call "Pwll-y-hwaid", as originally a "three-bayed wooden hall" but noted that, by the time of their survey in the mid-20th century, "only a portion survives". The house is of a timber-frame construction, with infilled, whitewashed rubble.

In the 19th century, the cottage was part of the Llanover and Coldbrook Estate. The house, which remains a private residence, is Grade II* listed, its listing record describing it as a "well-preserved late medieval cottage".

Notes

References 
 
Grade II* listed buildings in Monmouthshire

Country houses in Wales